Fernmeldeturm Koblenz is a free standing telecommunications tower on the mountain Kühkopf near Koblenz, Germany. It was built between 1972 and 1976. The Fernmeldeturm Kühkopf is  260.7 m (855.3 ft) high and not accessible to visitors.

See also 
 List of towers

Notes

External links 

 

Towers completed in 1976
Communication towers in Germany
Buildings and structures in Koblenz
1976 establishments in West Germany